The Republic Aviation AP-100 was a project for a VTOL, six-turbojet engined, nuclear capable, strike fighter concept designed by Alexander Kartveli, It had three ducted fans in the centre of its fuselage and tail and was a possible contender for the TFX Program. The project was designated as a "fighter", but in fact was a tactical attack aircraft capable of launching a small nuclear bomb. The weight of the aircraft would have been  with its engines generating  of thrust and capable of a speed of up to mach 2.3.

Specifications (AP-100, as designed)

References

External links
Video: Republic AP-100 model testing

Republic aircraft
VTOL aircraft
Six-engined jet aircraft
1950s United States experimental aircraft
Cancelled military aircraft projects of the United States